Arizona Wing Civil Air Patrol (AZWG) is one of 52 wings (50 states, Puerto Rico, and Washington, D.C.) in Civil Air Patrol (the official United States Air Force Auxiliary). Headquartered in Phoenix, Arizona, there are 20 squadrons listed on the AZWG website.

Mission
Arizona Wing performs the three missions of Civil Air Patrol: providing emergency services; offering cadet programs for youth; and providing aerospace education for both CAP members and the general public.

In March 2021, as a part of Civil Air Patrol's response in combating the COVID-19 pandemic, members of Arizona Wing provided support at a vaccine point of distribution.

Organization

See also
 Arizona Air National Guard
 Awards and decorations of the Civil Air Patrol

References

External links 
 Arizona Wing Website

Wings of the Civil Air Patrol
Education in Arizona
Military in Arizona
Organizations based in Phoenix, Arizona